Sofiane Guitoune (born 27 March 1989) is a French rugby union player. His position is fullback and he currently plays for Toulouse in the Top 14. He began his career with Agen, spent two seasons at Albi before moving to USA Perpignan in 2012.

Sofiane's mother was born in Vierzon, France, where his family of 5 returned to when Sofiane was 2 years old in June 1991 to live with his maternal grandmother, Djoher, who had remained in the town.

References

1989 births
Living people
French rugby union players
Algerian emigrants to France
Sportspeople from Algiers
SC Albi players
USA Perpignan players
Union Bordeaux Bègles players
Stade Toulousain players
Rugby union fullbacks
France international rugby union players
People from Vierzon
Sportspeople from Cher (department)
SU Agen Lot-et-Garonne players
21st-century French people